MiracleNet is a Christian television network run by Dr. Michael Hughes and Mrs. Sarah Hughes.  It is distributed to India and much of Asia via cable and satellite simultaneously in  Hindi, Urdu, Telugu, and Malayalam.

MiracleNet TV Network covering all of Asia by Satellite to Cable TV and by individual satellite dishes,

Audience
MiracleNet with Cable TV homes, has a potential audience of 113,770,000 Viewers in Asia,

Social Work
MiracleNet has been doing substantial Social work and acts of Mercy, which include Education, Health.

References

Christian entertainment television series
Television networks in India
Television channels and stations established in 1999
Religious television channels in India
Evangelical parachurch organizations
1999 establishments in India